Nishonai Dam is a rockfill dam located in Aomori Prefecture in Japan. It is used for irrigation and as an industrial water dam. The catchment area of the dam is 31.9 km2. The dam impounds about 65 ha of land when full and can store 15 600 000 m³ of water. It is 86 metres tall and has a width of 430.8 m.  The construction of the dam was started on 1973 and completed in 1995.

References

Dams in Aomori Prefecture
1995 establishments in Japan